Henry Sharp may refer to:

Henry E. Sharp (c.1850–c.1897), American stained glass maker
Henry Sharp (actor) (1889–1964), played the role of Abe Steiner in A Face in the Crowd
Henry Sharp (cinematographer) (1892–1966), American director of photography in motion pictures and television
Henry Graham Sharp (1917–1995), British figure skater

See also
 Harry Sharp (disambiguation)
Henry Sharpe (disambiguation)